Aliar may refer to:
 Aliar, East Azerbaijan
 Aliar, West Azerbaijan

See also
 Ali Yar (disambiguation)